Nicorette is a brand of nicotine-replacement products.

Nicorette may refer to:

Nicorette (1989 yacht), maxi yacht
Nicorette (1996 yacht), Ericsson 80 yacht
Nicorette II, maxi yacht
Nicorette III, maxi yacht